Brant Lake may refer to:

 Brant Lake, New York, a hamlet
 Brant Lake (New York), lake near the hamlet
 Brant Lake (South Dakota), a lake